Linda Balgord (born February 18, 1960) is an American Broadway actress and singer, most notable for playing Norma Desmond in the 1996 United States tour of Andrew Lloyd Webber's musical Sunset Boulevard, being the last actress to portray Grizabella in the original Broadway run of Cats, and originating the role of Queen Elizabeth I in The Pirate Queen on Broadway. She has also played the role of Madame Giry in Andrew Lloyd Webber's The Phantom of the Opera, in both the restaged North American tour and on Broadway.

Early life
Balgord was raised in New Lisbon, Wisconsin, and graduated from New Lisbon High School in 1978. She is a 1982 graduate of Viterbo University in La Crosse, Wisconsin, and she received a Master of Fine Arts, Acting, from the University of Wisconsin-Milwaukee.

Career
From 1982 to 1984, between her undergraduate graduation and beginning graduate studies, Balgord acted at the Fireside Theatre in Fort Atkinson, Wisconsin. Soon after she finished her graduate studies, Balgord went to Chicago and began acting at the Goodman Theater in Sunday in the Park With George. She moved to New York in 1990 and after five months gained the lead role in a two-year national tour of Aspects of Love. Her Broadway debut came in Passion.

Andrew Lloyd Webber personally chose Balgord to portray Norma Desmond in Sunset Boulevard.

Personal life 
Balgord married stage manager Andrew Fenton in July 1993. They met when both worked on the production of Aspect in Toronto.

Awards
Balgord received the Distinguished Young Alumna Award from Viterbo University in 1990. She received a Helen Hayes Non-Resident Acting award in 1993 and a Helen Hayes Resident Acting award in 1999. She also received a Drama Desk nomination for Outstanding featured actress in The Pirate Queen for her role as Queen Elizabeth I.

Notes

External links

Living people
Actresses from Wisconsin
People from New Lisbon, Wisconsin
American musical theatre actresses
1960 births
Viterbo University alumni
University of Wisconsin–Milwaukee alumni
21st-century American women